Washington Crossing is an unincorporated village located in Upper Makefield Township, Pennsylvania, United States. Formerly known as "Taylorsville," it is most famous for being the western launch point for George Washington's crossing of the Delaware River on the night of December 25–26, 1776 during the Revolutionary War.

The headquarters of Washington Crossing Historic Park is also located in Washington Crossing, Pennsylvania. The village is connected by Washington Crossing Bridge with Washington Crossing, New Jersey, which is located on the eastern side of the Delaware River.

Geography

Special events
The town also participates in special events, such as a reenactment of Washington's nighttime crossing each year. Its ZIP Code is 18977.

Points of interest 
 Bowman's Hill Wildflower Preserve
 Washington Crossing Historic Park

Gallery

References

External links

Unincorporated communities in Bucks County, Pennsylvania
Unincorporated communities in Pennsylvania
George Washington's crossing of the Delaware River